Munin is a free and open-source computer system monitoring, network monitoring, and infrastructure monitoring software application. 

Munin is written in Perl and uses RRDtool to create graphs, which are accessible over a web interface. Its emphasis is on plug and play capabilities. About 500 monitoring plugins are currently available. It is intended to make it easy to determine "what's different today" when a performance problem happens and to provide visibility into capacity and utilization of resources.

History

Munin was started by Jimmy Olsen late 2003, based on RRDtool by Tobi Oetiker. Development has slowed since 2005, but Munin is a stable tool and is still maintained.

“Its name is derived from Norse mythology. One of the two ravens who report the news of the world to the god Odin is called Munin, and the other is named Hugin. Munin is 'memory', and Hugin is 'thought'.”

Architecture

Plugins
Plugins are the specialized programs that are called by Munin nodes to gather and report current data, and describe how it should be presented. There are over 300 plugins in the core distribution, over 180 plugins in the official third-party contributed repository, and an unknown number of independently published plugins.

They can be written in any programming or scripting language. All they are required to do is print space separated key and value pairs on standard output. This framework makes it trivial to write customized plugins.

See also

 Comparison of network monitoring systems
 LAMP (software bundle)

References

External links

 

Free network management software
Internet Protocol based network software